Thomas Kidd may refer to:

Thomas Kyd (1558–1594), English dramatist
Thomas Kidd (British Columbia politician) (1846–1930), politician in British Columbia, Canada
Thomas Kidd (classical scholar) (1770–1850), English scholar and schoolmaster
Thomas Kidd (illustrator) (born 1955), American illustrator of children's books
Thomas Kidd (Ontario politician) (1889–1973), merchant and politician in Ontario, Canada
Thomas I. Kidd (1860–1941), Scottish-born American labor union leader
Thomas S. Kidd (born 1971), American historian
Tom Kidd (golfer) (died 1884), Scottish golfer
Tom Kidd (curler) (born 1945), Australian curler